Jalal Shaker is a former Iraqi football defender. He competed in the 1986 Asian Games. Shaker played for Iraq between 1986 and 1987.

References

Living people
Iraqi footballers
Iraq international footballers
Footballers at the 1986 Asian Games
Year of birth missing (living people)
Association football defenders
Asian Games competitors for Iraq